Zoutleeuw is a municipality and city in the Hageland, in the extreme east of the Belgian province of Flemish Brabant. On 1 January 2018 the municipality had 8,498 inhabitants. The total area is 46.73 km2, giving a population density of 182 inhabitants per km2.

The name Leeuw means "lion", to which Zout ("salt") was added from the 16th century in recognition of the town's right to levy a salt tax.

In 1999, UNESCO included the historical St. Leonard's Church as part of the World Heritage Site Belfries of Belgium and France.

Other centres
As well as Zoutleeuw proper, the municipality also comprises the ancienne communes of:
Budingen
Dormaal
Halle-Booienhoven
Helen-Bos
Ossenweg

References

External links

Official website (in Dutch)
Archaeology in Zoutleeuw

 
Municipalities of Flemish Brabant